The ski jumping competition of the Vancouver 2010 Olympics was held at Whistler Olympic Park between 12 and 22 February 2010.

Medal summary

Medal table

Events 
Three ski jumping events was held at Vancouver 2010 (all competitors are men):

Competition schedule 
All times are Pacific Standard Time (UTC-8).

Participating nations 

For the three events, there are a maximum 70 athletes allowed to compete. No nation can have more than five skiers. For each event, a nation can enter four skiers in individual event or one team in the team event.

Host nation Canada is expected to enter skiers in all events. If no skier meets the qualification standards, they can enter one skier per event.

Quota allocation per nation is based on the World Ranking List (WRL) consisting of Ski Jumping World Cup and Grand Prix points, followed by Continental Cup Standings from the 2008-09 and 2009-10 Ski Jumping World Cup. This will be made by assigning one quota slot per skier from the top of the standings downwards until the maximum five slots have been reached, including host nation Canada. When 60 slots are reached in an event where less than 12 nations have a minimum of four skiers allocated slot (and the nation is entered in the team event), the next nation with three skiers will be given a fourth slot until 12 nations can compete in the team event. Any open quota slots will be allocated until the maximum 70 skiers can be reached, including host nation Canada. This process started on 18 January 2010 and ran until 28 January 2010. Deadline to VANOC was 1 February 2010.

References

External links

 May 2009 FIS Qualification for the 2010 Winter Olympics. - accessed 21 January 2010. Ski jumping is on pages 7–8.
 Vancouver 2010 Olympic Winter Games Competition Schedule v12

 
2010
2010 Winter Olympics events
2010 in ski jumping
Ski jumping competitions in Canada